The 2012 All Thailand Golf Tour was the 14th season of the All Thailand Golf Tour, the main professional golf tour in Thailand since it was established in 1999.

Schedule
The following tables list official events during the 2012 season.

Men's events

Women's events

Order of Merit
The Order of Merit was based on prize money won during the season, calculated in Thai baht.

Notes

References

All Thailand Golf Tour
All Thailand Golf Tour